Sinan Bin Salamah bin Mohbik (8/628-53AH/673AD) born on the day of conquest of Makkah.

Biography
Salama, his father prepared to leave for the war of Hunain and heard the news of his birth, he compelled to put off his expedition but later expressed these words: 

Muhammad prayed for Sinan when he was taken to him. He as usual put his Lughab in his mouth. He also touched his face with blessing hands. He named him Sinan with subject to his father's words.

Sinan was a child he was habitual to collect the scattered dates in the garden. The day he was busy to collect the dates along with other children, the Caliph Umar happened to come there. The children went away within no time but Sinan remained still at that place and did not moved to go. The Caliph came near and inquired of him but he responded in a manner which moved the Caliph to love and help him to reach home safe and sound.

Battle 
Sinan Bin Salamah bin Mohbik sent two times as a governor of Sind (modern-day Pakistan) during 42 and 48AH(664,670AD) at the time of Amir Muawiyah I (41-60H/663-81AD).

Kalat: In the year of 42AH(664AD), Abdullah bin Sawar Abdi was martyred in the battle of Kalat, along with other warriors of Islam, Ziyad ibn Abih was appointed as the governor of  Khurasan. He deputed Sinan to complete the mission initiated by Abdullah bin Sawar Abdi, Sinan succeeded in bringing up under his control the territory of Kalat.
Sindh: In the year of 44AH(668AD), he entered the valley of Sindh from where he continued his proceedings towards Makran. After conquering the Makran area he made reforms.
Kohat: In the year of 53(673AD), conquering Kohat and Bunnu he entered the valley of Peshawar. He fought against the force of Buddhist. In this war Sinan was martyred with several fellow men.

See also
Chaghar Matti

References

External links
http://sahabanames.com/sinan/

628 births
673 deaths
Companions of the Prophet
Islam in Sindh
Islam in Pakistan
People from Mecca
Umayyad governors of Sind